The National Library of Belarus is the biggest library in the Republic of Belarus. The library is located in Minsk, the capital of Belarus. It houses the largest collection of Belarusian printed materials and the third largest collection of books in Russian behind the Russian State Library (Moscow) and the Russian National Library (Saint Petersburg).

Building 
Construction of the new building started in November 2002 and was completed in January 2006. The library's main architectural component has the shape of a rhombicuboctahedron. The height of the building is 73.6 metres (241.5 feet) and weight is 115 000 tonnes (not including books). The building has 23 floors. The National Library can seat about 2,000 readers and features a 500-seat conference hall. The library's new building was designed by architects Mihail Vinogradov and Viktor Kramarenko and opened on 16 June 2006. The National Library of Belarus is the main information and cultural centre of the country. Its depository collections include about 10 million items of various media.

Observation deck 
A special elevator for tourists leading is located on the backside of the building. The library's roof is located on the twenty third floor. The roof has an observation deck equipped with binoculars arranged over the perimeter. Also, there is a cafe and a gallery on the twenty second floor.

Interesting facts 

 Saddam Hussein donated half a million dollars (it was around 2-3 million) for the construction of the library.
 The building is also the subject of an art video by French artist Raphael Zarka, "Rhombus Sectus", shown at the Bischoff/Weiss gallery, London, in 2011.
 The building is featured heavily in the music video Discotheque (Дискотека) by the Belarusian rock band Molchat Doma, from their album Monument.

References

External links

 National Library of Belarus 
 Emporis Web site
 Official photo gallery
 Creative studio of the architect Victor Kramarenko
 Creative studio of the architect Mihail Vinogradov
 Bischoff/Weiss gallery

1922 establishments in Belarus
Library buildings completed in 2006
Belarus
Libraries in Belarus
Libraries established in 1922